The Asexual Visibility and Education Network (AVEN) was founded in 2001 by David Jay. Self-described as the "world's largest asexual community", it had grown to over 50,000 members by 2012.

Work 
When first starting the website, AVEN's main goals were to give the community space to grow and raise awareness for asexuality in public. AVEN serves as an informational platform for families, researchers, and press. One of the central parts of AVEN is the community forum. In this forum, people post about their experiences surrounding asexuality and the space is open to queer-friendly interactions without any sort of judgement or gatekeeping. In an interview with Femestella, Jay highlighted the importance of such open spaces for people who are unsure of their sexuality and having support to understand themselves better. The forums exist in many languages such as French and Russian.

AVEN also publishes a newsletter called AVENues every four months. It collects the voices of the community and includes fiction, poetry, articles and also publishes discussion pieces from the forum.

References 
Asexuality
LGBT organizations
Internet properties established in 2001
LGBT-related Internet forums